Kampf (the German word for "battle", "struggle" or "fight") may refer to:

 Kampf (surname)
 Der Kampf, Austrian socialist journal from 1907 and 1938
 Der Kampf, Luxembourg Communist newspaper from 1920 and 1922
Mein Kampf, autobiographical manifesto by Nazi Party leader Adolf Hitler
 Contest (1932 film), known in German as Kampf

See also 
 In Kampf, Polish Yiddish-language weekly newspaper
 Kempf (disambiguation)
 Kämpfer, 2006 Japanese light novel series